Cyartonema is a genus of nematodes in the order Monhysterida.

References

External links 

 
 WoRMS

Chromadorea genera